Oriella Dorella (born 25 January 1952) is an Italian ballet dancer.

Life and career 

Born in Milan, Dorella studied at La Scala Theatre Ballet School for 8 years, and in 1975 she made her official debut as a dancer, becoming the étoile of La Scala Theatre Ballet in 1986. She was also a television personality, and her television appearances include the Saturday night variety show Fantastico and several television films. In 2006 she ran for the Senate in Milan with Rose in the Fist, without being elected.

References

External links 
 

Living people
Italian television actresses
1952 births
Actresses from Milan
Italian television personalities
Italian ballerinas
La Scala Theatre Ballet dancers
20th-century Italian ballet dancers